The  Patellariaceae are a family of sac fungi. It is the only representative of the order Patellariales. According to a 2008 estimate, the family contains 15 genera and 38 species.

Genera

References 

Dothideomycetes enigmatic taxa
Ascomycota orders
Taxa named by David Leslie Hawksworth
Monotypic fungus taxa